Sigfrido Vogel (born September 1912, date of death unknown) was an Argentine sports shooter. He competed in the 50 m rifle, prone event at the 1932 Summer Olympics.

References

External links
 

1912 births
Year of death missing
Argentine male sport shooters
Olympic shooters of Argentina
Shooters at the 1932 Summer Olympics
Sportspeople from Córdoba Province, Argentina